The giant Hawaiian darner, also known as the giant Hawaiian dragonfly or pinao (Anax strenuus), is a species of dragonfly in the family Aeshnidae. It is one of two species of dragonfly that is endemic to the Hawaiian Islands. It is particularly common at higher elevations.

This species is one of the largest of all modern dragonflies, reaching a wingspan of 152 mm.

References

Aeshnidae
Insects of Hawaii
Insects described in 1867
Endemic fauna of Hawaii